Sankaravarman was a Chamar king of the Utpala dynasty, a Hindu kingdom which ruled over the Kashmir region from 8th to 10th century CE. The kingdom was established by Avantivarman, who ended the rule of Karkota dynasty in 855 CE.

Following the death of Avantivarman in 883 CE, a civil war broke out among his descendants resulting in Sankaravarman ruling from 885 CE until his death in 902 CE.

References 

Hindu monarchs
Utpala dynasty
Kashmir